Pilocrocis cuprescens is a moth in the family Crambidae. It was described by George Hampson in 1917. It is found in Peru.

The wingspan is about 32 mm. The forewings are pale cupreous brown, the costal and terminal areas purplish red brown with a cupreous gloss. There is an indistinct oblique brown antemedial line and a slight brown spot in the middle of the cell, as well as a discoidal lunule with whitish striga in the centre. The postmedial line is brown and there is a fine whitish line at the base of the cilia. The hindwings are pale cupreous brown, the apical area and termen darker brown. There is a brown discoidal bar and the postmedial line is brown.

References

Pilocrocis
Moths described in 1917
Moths of South America